The 2013–14 Charlotte Checkers season is the franchise's fourth season in the American Hockey League, which began on October 4, 2013.

Off season
Charlotte remained in the same division after an American Hockey League realignment in the summer of 2013, but it was renamed from the South Division to the West Division. The Checkers unveiled new uniforms for the 2013–14 season, preserving the team's logo and its red, black and white colors, but making several design changes including the removal of a hurricane warning flag strip, new fonts for the letters and numbers, and a greater distinction between the home red and away white uniforms. Mark Binetti, who had been Charlotte's assistant broadcaster, departed from the team to work for the Central Hockey League's Rapid City Rush. The Checkers underwent several roster changes in the off season, retaining only two skaters who finished in the team's top ten in scoring from the previous year: forwards Chris Terry and Zach Boychuk. As a result, coach Jeff Daniels said the team would have to focus more on crashing the net and scoring "dirty goals".

Some of the team's departures included forwards Zac Dalpe, Jeremy Welsh, David Marshall, Riley Nash, David Rutherford, and Tim Wallace; and defensemen Brett Bellemore, Danny Biega, Ryan Murphy, and Bobby Sanguinetti. Former team captain Brett Sutter, Charlotte's second-leading scorer the previous season, was recalled to the Carolina Hurricanes, although he would be returned to the Checkers by November. Center Manny Malhotra joined the Checkers roster, marking his return from a one-year absence due to a left eye injury. Other Charlotte newcomers included forwards Adam Brace, and Aaron Palushaj; and defensemen Matt Corrente, Mark Flood, and Keegan Lowe. After starting their training camp on September 23, Charlotte split a home-and-home preseason series against the Norfolk Admirals on September 27 and 28. Palushaj scored two goals, including the final empty netter in a 4–2 victory in the first game.

Regular season

October
The Checkers had only two home games in October, the lowest to start the season for any team in the league. But they also went their first five away games without a regulation loss, and never trailed in any of them. The Checkers started the season with two 3–2 victories against the Oklahoma City Barons on October 4 and 5, scoring the first two goals in both games. Terry scored the Charlotte's first goal of the season just 49 seconds into the season opener. After a two-week layoff, the Checkers lose two straight home games against the Iowa Wild on October 19 and 20, including a 7–2 loss in the latter game, where the Wild scored within the first 44 seconds. Charlotte would next play six away games in nine nights, none in consecutive locations, which marked their longest road trip in team history in term of consecutive days out of town. But they also saw a great deal of turnover in their goaltenders due to Mike Murphy and Justin Peters being recalled by the Carolina Hurricanes to fill in for the injured Cam Ward and Anton Khudobin. The Checkers would end up using five goalies in their first six games of the season. They signed professional tryout contracts to goaltenders Allen York, and Rick DiPietro, the 32-year-old veteran the New York Islanders released in July with a compliance buyout. Hurricane general manager Jim Rutherford called DiPietro's signing a "safety net" to provide more goaltending depth in light of their recent injuries.

John Muse made his first start of the season on October 25, stopping all 30 shots he faced in a 5–0 victory over the Grand Rapids Griffins. Boychuk, Flood and Terry each scored power play goals. The Checkers maintained a 110-minute shutout streak that ended against the Rockford IceHogs on October 26, which ended in a 2–1 loss after York allowed two of five shootout shots in his Charlotte debut. The Checkers secured another 5–0 win the next day against the Chicago Wolves, with Muse perfect for in second straight start, earning him the designation of AHL Player of the Week. Charlotte also scored three power play goals for the second time in three games, this time from Terry, Justin Shugg and Brody Sutter. The Checkers saw their first away loss in regulation on October 30, falling 5–2 to Grand Rapids, with DiPietro stopping 25 of 29 shots in his team debut. They defeated Rockford the next day, however, with Rask scoring two goals in a 5–3 victory. Holm scored at least one point in all nine games of the month, the best point streak of his career.

November
The Checkers fell into a five-game losing slump, tying a team record for consecutive losses. It started with a 5–3 loss to the San Antonio Rampage in which Charlotte surrendered a lead after allowing three goals in the third period, marking the first time they lost after leading at the second intermission. DiPietro's 37 saves were the most by a Checkers goalie since Rob Madore's 43 saves against the Texas Stars on April 12, 2013. Terry, who lead the team in goals for the season with six, in shots with 35, was recalled on November 6 by the Carolina Hurricanes, who in turn sent down 18-year-old rookie forward Elias Lindholm, the fifth overall pick in the 2013 NHL Entry Draft. Charlotte next lost a pair of games each against both the Chicago Wolves and the Hershey Bears, including an 8-1 loss against the Bears on November 14 that Daniels described as "pretty much rock bottom". The seven-goal deficit marked a franchise worst in any regular season. The game marked the Checkers' sixth straight home loss, marking their longest home losing streak in franchise history, and the longest such streak of any team in the league in the season thus far.

Standings

Conference standings

Schedule and results

Player statistics

Skaters
Note: GP = Games played; G = Goals; A = Assists; Pts = Points; +/− = Plus/minus; PIM = Penalty minutes
Source: 

†Denotes player spent time with another team before joining team. Stats reflect time with the team only.
‡Left the team mid-season
*Rookie

Goaltenders
Note: GP = Games played; TOI = Time on ice; W = Wins; L = Losses; GA = Goals against; GAA = Goals against average; SV = Saves; SA = Shots against; SV% = Save percentage; SO = Shutouts; G = Goals; A = Assists; PIM = Penalty minutes
Source

‡Left the team mid-season
*Rookie

Awards and records

Awards

Milestones

References

External links
Charlotte Checkers official site

Char
Charlotte Checkers
Char
Charlotte Checkers
Charlotte Checkers